The Maximilianstraße is a street in the old-town area of Augsburg in Germany. It is one of the city's most historic streets and is the site of the Fuggerhäuser.

Buildings and structures in Augsburg